Mystic Station or Mystic station could refer to:
 Mystic station (Connecticut), an Amtrak train station in Connecticut
 Mystic Generating Station, a power station in Massachusetts
 Mystic Water Works, a pumping station in Massachusetts